Decaisnina hollrungii is a species of flowering plant, an epiphytic hemiparasitic plant of the family Loranthaceae native to the New Guinea, Queensland, Australia, and in the Bismarck Archipelago and the Solomon Islands.

In Queensland, D. hollrungii is found in rainforest and in dense coastal scrub on a wide range of hosts.

Taxonomy
Decaisnina hollrungii was first described in 1889 as Loranthus hollrungii by Karl Moritz Schumann.  In 1894, Philippe Édouard Léon Van Tieghem assigned it to his new genus, Amylotheca. In 1966, Bryan Alwyn Barlow reassigned it to the genus, Decaisnina.

Etymology
The generic name, Decaisnina honours the French botanist Joseph Decaisne (1807–1882), and the specific epithet, hollrungii, honours the botanist Udo Max Hollrung (1858-1937).

References

External links
 Decaisnina hollrungii Occurrence data from the Australasian Virtual Herbarium

hollrungii
Flora of New Guinea
Flora of Queensland
Parasitic plants
Epiphytes
Taxa named by Karl Moritz Schumann
Plants described in 1889